Karabo Motlhanka (born 17 April 1992) is a Botswana cricketer. He played in the 2015 ICC World Cricket League Division Six tournament.

Motlhanka was appointed captain of Botswana at the age of 23. In October 2018, he captained the Botswana team in the Southern sub region group in the 2018–19 ICC World Twenty20 Africa Qualifier tournament. In the opening match of the tournament, he scored an unbeaten fifty and was named the man of the match. He was the leading run-scorer for Botswana in the tournament, with 196 runs in six matches.

In May 2019, he was named as the captain of Botswana's squad for the Regional Finals of the 2018–19 ICC T20 World Cup Africa Qualifier tournament in Uganda. He made his Twenty20 International (T20I) debut for Botswana against Uganda on 20 May 2019. In October 2021, he was named as the captain of Botswana's squad for their matches in Group B of the 2021 ICC Men's T20 World Cup Africa Qualifier tournament in Rwanda.

He made his first-class debut on 17 January 2022, playing for the Tuskers in the 2021–22 Logan Cup in Zimbabwe. He had been called up to play in Zimbabwe, after several of the Tuskers' squad were part of Zimbabwe's tour of Sri Lanka during January 2022.

References

External links
 

1992 births
Living people
Botswana cricketers
Botswana Twenty20 International cricketers
People from Gaborone
Matabeleland Tuskers cricketers